The name Saphon can refer to either:
 Nin Saphon, a Cambodian politician.
 Saphon, an Ugaritic name for Mount Hermon or its summit.